A river cruise is a voyage along inland waterways, often stopping at multiple ports along the way. Since cities and towns often grew up around rivers, river cruise ships frequently dock in the center of cities and towns.

Descriptions

River day cruises 
River day cruises are day excursions ranging from 30 minutes to a full day. They can be on boats carrying as few as 10 people or as many as a few hundred. Such a cruise is typically based in a city with a river flowing through the centre (e.g., Amsterdam, Bangkok, London, Paris, Varanasi) or an area of natural beauty, such as on the Hudson River, Rhine Thames and Ganga. Some popular locations include:
Africa: Luxor, Cairo
Americas: New York City, New Orleans, San Antonio, St. Louis
Asia: Bangkok, Ho Chi Minh City, Kuching, Malacca, Singapore, Varanasi
Europe: Amsterdam, Budapest, Cologne, London, Paris

River cruises 
River cruise ships with accommodation facilities offer longer cruises.

According to Douglas Ward, "A river cruise represents life in the slow lane, sailing along at a gentle pace, soaking up the scenery, with plentiful opportunities to explore riverside towns and cities en route. It is a supremely calming experience, an antidote to the pressures of life in a fast-paced world, in surroundings that are comfortable without being fussy or pretentious, with good food and enjoyable company."

River cruising is a major tourist industry in many parts of the world.

Africa: Nile
Americas: Mississippi, Peruvian Amazon
Asia: Brahmaputra, Ganga, Padma, Damodar, Irrawaddy, Mekong, Yangtze
Australia: Murray
Europe: Danube, Rhine, Seine, Rhone, Volga, Moselle, Main, Douro.

See Also 
 List of river films and television series

References

External links

Rivers
 
 
Leisure activities
Types of tourism
Types of travel
Water transport